The 1900 United States presidential election in South Dakota took place on November 6, 1900. All contemporary 45 states were part of the 1900 United States presidential election. State voters chose four electors to the Electoral College, which selected the president and vice president.

South Dakota was won by the Republican nominees, incumbent President William McKinley of Ohio and his running mate Theodore Roosevelt of New York.

McKinley won the state by a margin of 15.59 percentage points. McKinley had previously lost the state to William Jennings Bryan four years earlier, who in turn would lose the state to William Howard Taft in 1908.

Results

Results by county

See also
 United States presidential elections in South Dakota

Notes

References

South Dakota
1900
1900 South Dakota elections